The Tenaiko Range is a small subrange of the Kitimat Ranges in British Columbia, Canada. It is surrounded by the Gamsby River and Tenaiko Creek. It reaches a height of 1,042 meters above sea level.

References

Tenaiko Range in the Canadian Mountain Encyclopedia

Kitimat Ranges